William Buckland may refer to:
William Buckland (1784–1856), English geologist and palaeontologist
William Buckland (architect) (1734–1774), American architect
William Thomas Buckland (1798–1870), English surveyor and auctioneer 
William Francis Buckland (1847–1915), New Zealand politician
William Buckland (politician) (1819–1876), New Zealand politician
William Warwick Buckland (1859–1946), Roman Law scholar